Mahulena Bočanová (born 18 March 1967 in Prague) is a Czech actress and presenter. Since 2008 she works for ČRo1 Radiožurnál, a Czech radio-journal.

Selected filmography

References

External links
 
 Biography on csfd.cz

1967 births
Living people
Actresses from Prague
Czech film actresses
Czech child actresses
20th-century Czech actresses
21st-century Czech actresses